Bent Tree Harbor is an unincorporated community and census-designated place (CDP) in Benton County, Missouri, United States. It is bordered to the northwest and northeast by arms of Harry S. Truman Reservoir on the South Grand River, a tributary of the Osage River.

Bent Tree Harbor was first listed as a CDP prior to the 2020 census.

Demographics

References 

Census-designated places in Benton County, Missouri
Census-designated places in Missouri